Robot Mosh Fest was a Metal/Hardcore music Festival that originated in Milwaukee, Wisconsin in 2001 and took place annually in the Milwaukee area.

The festival was originally titled Hugs and Chugs Fest and was booked by Art Henke. Art created bootleg videos of the show and the bands sold them at their shows, which helped build hype for the following year. The name change was inspired by Forever is Forgotten's song, Destroying a Lifetime of Innocence, which sounded like two robots fighting. This song led Art Henke and Robot Mosh Fest flyer artist, Michael Adler, to create Robot outfits and fight during a show, which in turn led to Robot Mosh Fest. Art went on to book Robot Mosh Fest 2002. CDRs packaged in DVD cases with full art were used as successful promotional flyers and would become a staple for each year's festival. Andy Parmann filmed the show and created bootleg videos for the bands to sell, which helped build hype for the following year. Unfortunately Robot Mosh Fest 2003 never happened. Art passed the Robot Mosh Fest torch to Andy Parmann who proceeded to book the next two festivals (2004-2005), each gaining more exposure, larger acts and crowds. In 2006, Andy was joined by Steve Roche who helped co-organize the following three years of the festival (2006-2008), which included breaking the festival into two days, elevating it to National attention. In 2007, Fox news covered the event and interviewed show-goers. 

Andy, Michael and Art ran a website (www.didntthathurt.com) dedicated to documenting metal and hardcore music in Milwaukee, WI. The site was the hub of Milwaukee's underground metal and hardcore scene during the festivals lifespan. It even crashed a few times due to bandwidth overloads from the interest of the festival.

The Festival showcased the best in local, national, and international Metal bands.

Scheduled Lineups (2001-2008)
Hugs and Chugs Fest 2001
Caliban, Bloodjinn, Seven Angels Seven Plagues, Endthisday, Shoot the Hostage, The Chaos Diaries, Today I Wait, Forever Is Forgotten, Killtheslavemaster

Robot Mosh Fest 2002
Bleeding Through, Bury Your Dead, Die Alone, Every Time I Die, Fordirelifesake, Forever Is Forgotten, Kid Brother Collective, Seven Angels Seven Plagues, Wafflehouse, Wings of Scarlet

Robot Mosh Fest 2004
Dead to Fall, Die Alone, Drowning Man, Ed Gein, Forever Is Forgotten, From a Second Story Window, If Hope Dies, Last Perfection, Planes Mistaken for Stars, Psyopus, Sincebyman, The Breathing Process, Wings of Scarlet, Wires on Fire

Robot Mosh Fest 2005
Amora Savant, All Shall Perish, Analog, Burning Love Letters, Die Alone, Ion Dissonance, Nehemiah, Paria, Premonitions of War, Psyopus, Silo, Strong Intention, Swarm of the Lotus, Veil of Maya, Wings of Scarlet

Robot Mosh Fest 2006
After the Burial, All Shall Perish, Amora Savant, Animosity, Carnivale, Cattle Decapitation, Crossbearer, Die Alone, Dead to Fall, Everest, From a Second Story Window, Harlots, Hewhocorrupts, Ion Dissonance, Job for a Cowboy, Light This City, Lye by Mistake, Misery Index, My Bitter End, Nuclear Powered Satan, Sleep Terror, Suicide Silence, The Tony Danza Tapdance Extravaganza, Too Pure to Die, Veil of Maya, With Dead Hands Rising

Robot Mosh Fest 2007
A Life Once Lost, After the Burial, An End to Flesh, As Blood Runs Black, Beneath the Massacre, Beneath the Sky, The Black Dahlia Murder, Born of Osiris, Carnivale, Catherine, Cattle Decapitation, Cephalic Carnage, Decapitated, Dead to Fall, Empire, Emmure, Everest, The Faceless, Fordirelifesake, From a Second Story Window, Harlots, Hewhocorrupts, Ion Dissonance, Lye by Mistake, Necrophagist, Paria, Plague Bringer, Russian Circles, Shit Outta Luck, Tower of Rome, Veil of Maya, Winds of Plague, With Dead Hands Rising

Robot Mosh Fest 2008
Poison the Well, A Life Once Lost, Veil of Maya, Hewhocorrupts, With Dead Hands Rising, Paria, Harlots, Get Rad, Farewell to Twilight, Protestant, Cougar Den, Devil's Pie, Widower, Darkest Hour, Misery Signals, Parkway Drive, Winds of Plague, Stick to Your Guns, After the Burial, Arsis, Abigail Williams, Arsonists Get All the Girls, In the Face of War, Asrava, Half Gorilla, Wholehearted

External links
Robot Mosh Fest on Myspace
Didn't That Hurt?

Rock festivals in the United States
Heavy metal festivals in the United States